Havelbus, or Havelbus Verkehrsgesellschaft mbH, is the largest bus operating company in Brandenburg, Germany, serving the areas of Potsdam, Potsdam-Mittelmark and Havelland.

Prices are regulated by the regional transport association VBB.

Havelbus Kickers
The company also operates a football club in the Havelland-Mitte Stadtklasse, the SV Havelbus Kickers.

References

External links 
Havelbus Verkehrsgesellschaft mbH Potsdam 

Public bus companies of Germany
Transport companies established in 1992
Transport in Brandenburg
Transport in Potsdam